Dmitriyevka is a rural locality (a selo) in Solodchinskoye Rural Settlement, Olkhovsky District, Volgograd Oblast, Russia. The population was 87 as of 2010.

Geography 
Dmitriyevka is located in steppe, on the right bank of the Ilovlya River, 30 km southwest of Olkhovka (the district's administrative centre) by road. Zakharovka is the nearest rural locality.

References 

Rural localities in Olkhovsky District
Tsaritsynsky Uyezd